The 1923–24 Washington Huskies men's basketball team represented the University of Washington for the  NCAA college basketball season. Led by fourth-year head coach Hec Edmundson, the Huskies were members of the Pacific Coast Conference and played their home games on campus in Seattle, Washington.

Washington traveled to Oakland for the PCC championship series against California, the winner of the Southern  The Golden Bears won both games in overtime to take the conference crown.

Postseason results

|-
!colspan=6 style=| Pacific Coast Conference Playoff Series

References

External links
Sports Reference – Washington Huskies: 1923–24 basketball season
Washington Huskies men's basketball media guide (2009–10) – History

Washington Huskies men's basketball seasons
Washington Huskies
Washington
Washington